Kristine (or Kristīne as in Latvian) variant of Christine, is a feminine given name. It may refer to: 
 Kristine Aleksanyan (born 1989), Armenian footballer
 Kristine Andersen (born 1976), Danish handball player
 Kristine Anigwe (born 1997), Nigerian-American basketball player
 Kristine Aono (born 1960), American artist
 Kristine Arnold (born 1956), country singer and member of Sweethearts of the Rodeo, born Kristine Oliver
 Kristine Austgulen (born 1980), Norwegian basketball player
 Kristine Baker (born 1971), American judge
 Kristine Balanas (born 1990), Latvian violinist
 Kristine Bartlett, New Zealander aged care worker and equal pay activist
 Kristine Brown (born 1953), African-American vocalist better known as Iqua Colson
 Kristine Carlin Bay (born 1963), American model better known as Willow Bay
 Kristine Bayley (born 1983), Australian cyclist
 Kristine Bell, American electrical engineer
 Kristine Belson, American film producer
 Princess Kristine Bernadotte (1932–2014), Swedish princess born Kristine Rivelsrud
 Kristine Bonnevie (1872–1942), Norwegian biologist and professor
 Kristine Breistøl (born 1993), Norwegian handball player
 Kristine Carlson (born 1963), American author
 Kristine Cecava, American judge
 Kristine Davanger (born 1993), Norwegian curler
 Kristine DeBell (born 1954), American actress
 Kristīne Djadenko (born 1984), Latvian beauty pageant competitor
 Kristine Edner (born 1976), Norwegian footballer
 Kristine Elezaj, Armenian-American singer
 Kristine Esebua (born 1985), Georgian archer
 Kristine Meredith Flaherty (born 1985), American rapper known as K.Flay
 Kristine French, Australian biologist
 Kristine Froseth (born 1998), Norwegian model
 Kristīne Gaile (born 1997), Latvian figure skater
 Kristine Gebbie, American nursing professor and former US AIDS "Czar"
 Kristīne Giržda (born 1993), Latvian footballer
 Kristine Haglund, American historian
 Kristine Hakobyan (born 1988), Armenian footballer
 Kristine Hanson (born 1951), American television broadcaster
 Kristine Harutyunyan (born 1991), Armenian Olympic javelin thrower
 Kristine Duvholt Havnås (born 1974), Norwegian handballer
 Kristine Hermosa (born 1983), Filipino actress
 Kristine Holzer (born 1974), American speed skater
 Kristine A. Huskey, American lawyer
 Kristine Jarinovska (born 1977), Latvian legal scholar and civil servant
 Kristine Jensen (born 1956), Danish architect
 Kristine Marie Jensen (1858–1923), Danish cookbook writer
 Kristine Jepson (1962–2017), American opera singer
 Kristine Johnson (born 1972), American news anchor
 Kristīne Kārkliņa (born 1983), Latvian basketball player
 Kristine Karr, a fictional character from American soap opera One Life to Live
 Kristine Kershul, American linguist
 Kristine Khachatryan (born 1989), Armenian cross-country skier
 Kristine Kochanski, fictional character from British sci-fi sitcom Red Dwarf
 Kristine Kristiansen (born 1975), Norwegian alpine skier
 Kristine Kunce (born 1970), also known as Kristine Radford, Australian tennis player
 Kristine Leahy (born 1986), American television host and sports reporter
 Kristine Y. Lee (born 1985), American figure skater
 Kristine Lefebvre, American lawyer and The Apprentice contestant
 Kristine Levine (born 1970), American comedian
 Kristine Lilly (born 1971), American soccer player
 Kristine Lunde-Borgersen (born 1980), Norwegian handballer
 Kristine Lytton, American state politician and Democratic representative in the Washington House of Representatives
 Kristine Luken (1964–2010), American murder victim in Palestine
 Kristine Mangasaryan (born 1991), Armenian footballer
 Kristine Mann (1873–1945), American psychologist
 Kristine McKenna, American journalist
 Kristine Miller (1925–2015), actress
 Kristine Minde (born 1992), Norwegian footballer
 Kristine Mirelle, contestant in the third season of the US version of The X-Factor
 Kristine Moldestad (born 1969), Norwegian handballer player
 Kristine Musademba (born 1992), American figure skater
 Kristine Næss (born 1964), Norwegian author
 Kristīne Nevarauska (born 1981), Latvian actress
 Kristine Nielsen (born 1955), American theater actress
 Kristine Nitzsche (born 1959), East German pentathlete and high jumper
 Kristine Norelius (born 1956), American rower
 Kristine Nøstmo (born 1993), Norwegian football goalkeeper
 Kristine O'Brien (born 1991), American rower and 2015 coxless four world champion
 Kristine Ødegaard, Norwegian ski-orienteer and 1992 world bronze medallist
 Kristīne Opolais (born 1979), Latvian operatic soprano
 Kristine Pedersen (born 1986), Danish footballer
 Kristine Peterson, American filmmaker
 Kristine Cathrine Ploug (1760–1837), Norwegian relative of playwright Henrik Ibsen and basis for some of his characters
 Kristine Quance (born 1975), also known as Kristine Julian, American swimmer and Olympic gold medallist
 Kristine Reeves, American state politician and Democrat representative in the Washington House of Representatives
 Kirstine Roepstorff (born 1972), Danish artist
 Kristine Rolofson (born 1975), American romance novelist
 Kristine Rose, American actress and model
 Kristine Roug (born 1975), Danish sailor and 1996 Olympic gold medallist
 Kristine Kathryn Rusch (born 1960), American writer and editor
 Kristine Rusten (1940–2003), Norwegian Labour politician
 Kristine Sa (born 1982), Vietnamese-Canadian singer
 Kristine Saastad (born 1987), Norwegian racing cyclist
 Kristīne Šefere (born 1981), Latvian badminton player
 Kristine Smith, American sci-fi and fantasy writer
 Kristine Sommer (born 1990), American rugby player
 Kristine Sparkle, stage name of Christine Holmes, member of British vocal group The Family Dogg
 Kristine Stiles (born 1947), American art historian
 Kristine Sutherland (born 1955), American actress who starred on Buffy The Vampire Slayer
 Kristine Svinicki (born 1966), American nuclear engineer and safety regulator
 Kristine Tånnander (born 1955), Swedish heptathlete
 Kristine Thatcher (born 1955), American playwright, director, and actress
 Kristine Tompkins (born 1950), American conservationist
 Kristīne Ulberga (born 1979), Latvian novelist
 Kristine Valdresdatter, the title character of a 1930 Norwegian silent film
 Kristine Andersen Vesterfjell (1910–1987) was a Norwegian, South Sami reindeer herder and cultural advocate
 Kristine Vetulani-Belfoure (1924–2004) Polish translator
 Kristīne Vītola (born 1991), Latvian basketball player
 Kristine Vongvanij (born 1987), Thai actress
 Kristine W, full name Kristine Weitz (born 1962), American singer-songwriter
 Kristine Winder (1955–2011), Canadian model and former Playboy Playmate of the Month
 Kristine Woods, American sculptor and textile artist
 Kristine Yaffe, American psychiatrist and neurologist

See also 
 All pages beginning with Christine

Feminine given names